Tiryani is a village and a deep forest area in Komaram Bheem District. Schedule tribes are the majority people in this mandal who live by hunting animals and the great Arjun valley locates 12 km from the mandal headquarters where the Pandavas in Mahabharatha did a Vanavasa (exile).

References 

Villages in Komaram Bheem district
Mandals in Komaram Bheem district